Meuser is a surname. Notable people with the surname include:

Dan Meuser (born 1964), American businessman and politician
Jay Meuser (1911–1963), American abstract expressionist painter
Micki Meuser, German bass player, studio musician, and music producer

See also
Messer (surname)